GTPase HRas, from "Harvey Rat sarcoma virus", also known as transforming protein p21 is an enzyme that in humans is encoded by the  gene. The HRAS gene is located on the short (p) arm of chromosome 11 at position 15.5, from base pair 522,241 to base pair 525,549. HRas is a small G protein in the Ras subfamily of the Ras superfamily of small GTPases. Once bound to Guanosine triphosphate, H-Ras will activate a Raf kinase like c-Raf, the next step in the MAPK/ERK pathway.

Function 
GTPase HRas is involved in regulating cell division in response to growth factor stimulation. Growth factors act by binding cell surface receptors that span the cell's plasma membrane.  Once activated, receptors stimulate signal transduction events in the cytoplasm, a process by which proteins and second messengers relay signals from outside the cell to the cell nucleus and instructs the cell to grow or divide. The HRAS protein is a GTPase and is an early player in many signal transduction pathways and is usually associated with cell membranes due to the presence of an isoprenyl group on its C-terminus.  HRAS acts as a molecular on/off switch, once it is turned on it recruits and activates proteins necessary for the propagation of the receptor's signal, such as c-Raf and PI 3-kinase.  HRAS binds to GTP in the active state and possesses an intrinsic enzymatic activity that cleaves the terminal phosphate of this nucleotide converting it to GDP. Upon conversion of GTP to GDP, HRAS is turned off.  The rate of conversion is usually slow but can be sped up dramatically by an accessory protein of the GTPase activating protein (GAP) class, for example RasGAP.  In turn HRAS can bind to proteins of the Guanine Nucleotide Exchange Factor (GEF) class, for example SOS1, which forces the release of bound nucleotide.  Subsequently, GTP  present in the cytosol binds and HRAS-GTP dissociates from the GEF, resulting in HRAS activation.  HRAS is in the Ras family, which also includes two other proto-oncogenes: KRAS and NRAS.  These proteins all are regulated in the same manner and appear to differ largely in their sites of action within the cell.

Clinical significance

Costello syndrome 

At least five inherited mutations in the HRAS gene have been identified in people with Costello syndrome. Each of these mutations changes an amino acid in a critical region of the HRAS protein. The most common mutation replaces the amino acid glycine with the amino acid serine at position 12 (written as Gly12Ser or G12S).  The mutations responsible for Costello syndrome lead to the production of an HRAS protein that is permanently active. Instead of triggering cell growth in response to particular signals from outside the cell, the overactive protein directs cells to grow and divide constantly. This uncontrolled cell division can result in the formation of noncancerous and cancerous tumors. Researchers are uncertain how mutations in the HRAS gene cause the other features of Costello syndrome (such as mental retardation, distinctive facial features, and heart problems), but many of the signs and symptoms probably result from cell overgrowth and abnormal cell

Bladder cancer 
HRAS has been shown to be a proto-oncogene. When mutated, proto-oncogenes have the potential to cause normal cells to become cancerous.  Some gene mutations are acquired during a person's lifetime and are present only in certain cells. These changes are called somatic mutations and are not inherited. Somatic mutations in the HRAS gene in bladder cells have been associated with bladder cancer. One specific mutation has been identified in a significant percentage of bladder tumors; this mutation substitutes one protein building block (amino acid) for another amino acid in the HRAS protein. Specifically, the mutation replaces the amino acid glycine with the amino acid valine at position 12 (written as Gly12Val, G12V, or H-RasV12). The altered HRAS protein is permanently activated within the cell. This overactive protein directs the cell to grow and divide in the absence of outside signals, leading to uncontrolled cell division and the formation of a tumor. Mutations in the HRAS gene also have been associated with the progression of bladder cancer and an increased risk of tumor recurrence after treatment.

Other cancers 
Somatic mutations in the HRAS gene are probably involved in the development of several other types of cancer. These mutations lead to an HRAS protein that is always active and can direct cells to grow and divide without control. Recent studies suggest that HRAS mutations are common in thyroid, salivary duct carcinoma, epithelial-myoepithelial carcinoma, and kidney cancers. 
DNA copy-number gain of a segment containing HRAS is included in a genome-wide pattern, which was found to be correlated with an astrocytoma patient's outcome.

The HRAS protein also may be produced at higher levels (overexpressed) in other types of cancer cells.

References

Further reading

External links 
  GeneReviews/NCBI/NIH/UW entry on Costello syndrome
 

Oncogenes